Car Seat Headrest (CSH) is an American indie rock band formed in Leesburg, Virginia, and currently located in Seattle, Washington. The band consists of Will Toledo (vocals, guitar, piano, synthesizers), Ethan Ives (guitar, bass, backing vocals), Seth Dalby (bass), and Andrew Katz (drums, percussion, backing vocals).

Beginning as a solo recording project by Toledo in 2010, Car Seat Headrest self-released 12 projects on the music platform Bandcamp between 2010 and 2014 before signing to Matador Records in 2015. They would begin touring as a full band the following year.

History

2010–2014: Lo-fi and solo releases, from 1 to How to Leave Town
Car Seat Headrest began as the solo project of singer/songwriter and multi-instrumentalist Will Toledo (born William Barnes) shortly after he graduated high school. Toledo had previously released music under the alias Nervous Young Men, but after struggling to establish an audience, he decided to change tactics, choosing to try and release more experimental songs anonymously. Toledo chose the name "Car Seat Headrest" as he would often record the vocals to his early albums in the back seat of his car for privacy. 

Throughout the summer of 2010, Toledo released his first four albums under the Car Seat Headrest name: 1, 2, 3, and 4. 1 and 2 incorporated less traditional song structures, with stream-of-consciousness lyrics, whereas 3 and 4 would begin to cement his lo-fi indie rock style. Following the numbered albums, Toledo began attending classes at Virginia Commonwealth University, releasing the Sunburned Shirts EP during his first semester. The Sunburned Shirts EP would later be semi-combined with his fifth LP, 5 (now removed from their Bandcamp), to create his first titled album, My Back Is Killing Me Baby, released in March 2011. Songs culled from 5 would later appear on the B-sides compilation album Little Pieces of Paper with "No" Written on Them.

After a difficult and lonely semester at VCU, Toledo transferred to the College of William & Mary, where he would release his next project, Twin Fantasy, a concept album centering around a relationship he was in at the time. Twin Fantasy would later be followed up by 2012's Monomania and Living While Starving EP.

Around this time, Toledo began performing live shows with fellow students Katie Wood, Austin Ruhf, and Christian Northover, recording and releasing a short live album in July 2013 entitled Live at WCWM: Car Seat Headrest at the university's studio. Toledo would release his next project the following month, a two-hour-long double album entitled Nervous Young Man. Three of the songs, and the title of the album, were taken from his original project, Nervous Young Men, but had been heavily reworked and re-recorded. Released alongside Nervous Young Man, for those who paid $5 or more, was the outtakes compilation album Disjecta Membra.

Toledo's final solo release was 2014's How to Leave Town, an hour-long EP with heavy electronic instrumentation and more ambitious song structures.

2015–2017: Matador Records, Teens of Style and Teens of Denial

In September 2015, Car Seat Headrest announced on Facebook that they had signed an album deal with Matador Records. Toledo, who had recently graduated and moved to Seattle, recruited bassist Jacob Bloom and drummer Andrew Katz through Craigslist to record and tour his next album. In October 2015, Car Seat Headrest released the compilation album Teens of Style, consisting of re-recorded material from Toledo's solo discography and was their first record to not be self-released exclusively via Bandcamp. Shortly after the album's release, Bloom left the group to attend medical school and was replaced by bassist Ethan Ives, who met the band at an open mic.

Ives played bass throughout most of the recordings for the band's following release, but would later switch to guitar and other instruments, with Seth Dalby taking over on bass. Ives and Dalby were later cemented in these positions during live shows and future releases. The new album, created with traditional studio processes, Teens of Denial, was released on May 20, 2016. The album received universal acclaim and brought the band a new wave of popularity.

In 2017, Car Seat Headrest released an alternate mix of their single, "War Is Coming (If You Want It)" through Bandcamp for one day, with profits going to the Transgender Law Center. The original mix of the track was released ten days later.

On December 13, 2017, the band released a re-recorded version of "Beach Life-In-Death", the second track on Twin Fantasy, through Spotify without prior announcement. This sparked fan rumours that the album would be re-recorded and released the following year. On December 27, 2017, an Amazon listing detailing a re-recorded version of Twin Fantasy was found by fans, and subsequently uploaded to the Car Seat Headrest subreddit. This was followed up by a listing on SRCVinyl.com with the date February 16, 2018.

2018–2019: Twin Fantasy (Face to Face) and Commit Yourself Completely 

On January 9, 2018, Matador Records formally announced the release of the re-recording, entitled Twin Fantasy (Face to Face), alongside a re-release of the original album. Twin Fantasy (Face to Face) was released via Matador on February 16. The original, which has been re-titled Twin Fantasy (Mirror to Mirror), was released on vinyl as a part of Record Store Day on April 21. On February 15, 2018, the band released a cover of "Fallen Horses" by Smash Mouth, who had previously covered "Something Soon" (from 2011's My Back Is Killing Me Baby). Around the same time, Car Seat Headrest would begin touring with fellow Seattle-based band, Naked Giants, as a part of the group's expanded live lineup. Toledo would also produce and feature on Midnight, the sophomore album by Stef Chura.

In August 2018, when asked about new material, Toledo confirmed that he was “demoing out stuff in Ableton,” adding “there might be some stuff that surprises people who only know us as a rock band, but I don’t think it will come as a surprise to people who are checking out all the deep cuts". In January 2019, Andrew Katz confirmed the band was recording new music through a video uploaded on Instagram.

Following the tease of new music, the band began experimenting with new material at various live shows in December 2018, debuting the tracks "Weightlifters", "Hollywood", "Stop Lying To Me", and "You Know There's Someone Out There", soon followed by "Can't Cool Me Down" in February and March 2019 performances. 

On June 12, 2019, Car Seat Headrest announced a new live album titled Commit Yourself Completely, featuring official recordings of performances from the Twin Fantasy tour from 2018. It was released the following week on June 17.

2020–present: Making a Door Less Open 
On February 26, 2020, Car Seat Headrest announced their first studio album consisting of wholly new material since 2016's Teens of Denial, Making a Door Less Open. This announcement coincided with the release of "Can't Cool Me Down", the first single and second track off the album, and a release date of May 1, 2020. It marks a stylistic divergence from previous material, Toledo describing the album as containing elements of EDM, hip hop, futurism, doo-wop, soul and rock and roll. Three more singles were released to promote the album between March and April of that year: "Martin", "Hollywood" and "There Must Be More Than Blood". The release also coincided with the introduction of Trait, an alternative persona of Toledo's, featured prominently wearing a modified gas mask with blinking LED lights for eyes, and floppy, rabbit-like ears. The character had originally been created for the group's "comedic" side project, 1 Trait Danger, featuring Toledo alongside drummer Andrew Katz.

Making a Door Less Open was released with three separate versions across different formats: vinyl, CD and streaming, each with variations in track-list and specific musical elements. The album received a mixed reaction from fans, who pointed out the many divergences from the band's previous works, but received an overall score of 77 on review aggregate site Metacritic. Toledo noted that he and the band were working on a companion album for their latest release, while also looking for ways to improve the Trait mask to incorporate it into live performances. Shortly after the album's release, Ethan Ives would release his debut solo album, Life for Cowards, under the name Toy Bastard.

Due to the 2020 COVID-19 pandemic, the band's planned North America tour was cancelled, later being rescheduled to the spring of 2022.

On June 22, 2021, Car Seat Headrest released two EPs: MADLO: Influences, a collection of four covers, including one of Kate Bush's Running Up That Hill, and MADLO: Remixes, consisting of five remixed versions of tracks from Making a Door Less Open. In the same year, Toledo produced the album How to Drive a Bus by New Jersey-based band I've Made Too Much Pasta. Katz is also credited alongside Toledo for mastering the album.

Style
AllMusic biographer Mark Deming wrote that Car Seat Headrest created "moody and introspective lo-fi pop tunes that are melodic but structurally ambitious at once". Writing for Pitchfork, Jeremy Gordon stated that on Teens of Denial, "Will Toledo reaffirms that he is ahead of the pack as an imaginative singer-songwriter, capable of crafting dynamic indie rock." Ian Cohen of Pitchfork also described Toledo's music as "dense, confounding music that most often captures the giddy thrill of having access to recording equipment, of finally put a sound to the voice in your head." Rolling Stone described Making a Door Less Open as "an immersive and adventurous album that sounds polished, but never slick, a well-executed experiment in cross-genre pollination that heightens Toledo’s best songwriting impulses." Toledo has been open about his musical influences, which include, but are not limited to, Radiohead, The Beatles, The Beach Boys, Leonard Cohen, The Monkees, R.E.M., Nirvana, Green Day, The Who, Pavement, Kendrick Lamar, Daniel Johnston, Sufjan Stevens, Destroyer, and They Might Be Giants.

Members
Current members
Will Toledo – vocals, guitar, keyboards (2010–present), drums, bass (2010–2015)
Ethan Ives – guitar, backing vocals (2016–present), bass guitar (2015–2016)
Andrew Katz – drums, backing vocals (2014–present)
Seth Dalby – bass guitar (2016–present, 2011 session)

Touring members
 Grant Mullen – guitar, backing vocals (2016, 2018−2019)
 Gianni Aiello – guitar, keyboards, backing vocals (2016, 2018−2019)
 Henry LaVallee – additional percussion (2016, 2018−2019)
 Ben Roth – keyboards (2022−present)
Former members
Katie Wood – guitar, backing vocals (2012–2014)
Austin Ruhf – bass guitar, backing vocals, cello (2012–2014)
Christian Northover – drums (2012–2014)
Will Marsh – guitar (2012)
Jacob Bloom – bass guitar (2014–2015)

Timeline

Discography

 1 (2010)
 2 (2010)
 3 (2010)
 4 (2010)
 My Back is Killing Me Baby (2011)
 Twin Fantasy (2011)
 Monomania (2012)
 Nervous Young Man (2013)
 Teens of Style (2015)
 Teens of Denial (2016)
 Twin Fantasy (Face to Face) (2018)
 Making a Door Less Open (2020)

References

External links
 Official website
 Bandcamp Page
 Car Seat Headrest @ Matadorrecords.com

2010 establishments in Virginia
Musical quartets
Musical groups established in 2010
Alternative rock groups from Virginia
Indie rock musical groups from Virginia
Matador Records artists
LGBT-themed musical groups